The romanization of Cyrillic is the process of converting text written in the Cyrillic script into the Latin (or Roman) alphabetic script, or a system for such conversion. 

Conversion of scripts can be classified as either the letter-by-letter transliteration or the phonemic or phonetic transcription of speech sounds, although in practice most systems have characteristics of both. 

Transliteration systems:

ISO 9
Romanization of Belarusian
Romanization of Bulgarian
Romanization of Kyrgyz
Romanization of Macedonian
Romanization of Persian (Tajik)
Romanization of Russian
Romanization of Serbian
Romanization of Ukrainian
Scientific transliteration of Cyrillic
Transcription:

 International Phonetic Alphabet

See also
Romanization of Greek